J'Leon Love (born September 25, 1987) is an American professional boxer in the Super Middleweight division.

Amateur career 
After his father turned him onto boxing, Love had an amateur career record of 115-5. His opponents have included Shawn Porter, Dennis Douglin.

Amateur Record:
2006-2009 Detroit Golden Gloves Champion
2006-2008 US. Michigan State Champion
2007 National Ringside World Champion
2007 National Golden Gloves Silver Medalist
2007 National PAL Silver Medalist
2008 Olympic Training Partner

Professional career 

On January 29, 2010, Love made his professional debut by knocking out Vince Burkhalter in the first round of a four-round middleweight bout. Love knocked Burkhalter down twice before the referee reached the count of 10 at 1:33.

On September 8, 2012, Love fought Ramon Valenzuela in the opening bout of Showtime Championship Boxing.  Love won by disqualification in the eighth round.

On May 4, 2013, Love fought Gabriel Rosado on the undercard of Floyd Mayweather vs Robert Guerrero. Prior to the fight, Love came two hours late to the weigh-in, and at the weigh-in he was 1.5 lbs over the weight limit. He took an extra hour to make the weight and was fined $100 as a result. The fight was very close, and although Love won by split decision, the majority of viewers thought that Rosado actually won the fight. The judges' score cards read 95-94 97-92 for Love and 95-94 for Rosado.

After the fight, Love tested positive for hydrochlorothiazide, a diuretic used by athletes to cut weight. The drug is banned by the Nevada State Athletic Commission. Because of the failed drug test, the decision was overturned from a split decision win for Love to a no contest.

On August 4, 2018, Love lost to former WBO champion Peter Quillin. Love was mainly on the defensive side throughout the fight, Quillin being the one to push the pace and attack. The judges ended up scoring the fight 98-92 twice and 99-11 once to reward Quilling the unanimous-decision victory.

In his next fight, Love faced another former champion in David Benavidez. Both fighters had their moments in the opening round. In the second round, Benavidez was the one coming forward. Halfway through the round Benavidez caught Love with a big right hand, following it up with a flurry of punches that forced the referee to stop the fight.

Personal life
Love is Muslim. He is also vegan.

He is the assistant coach of Jake Paul.

Professional boxing record

{|class="wikitable" style="text-align:center"
|-
!
!Result
!Record
!Opponent 
!Type
!Round, time
!Date
!Location
!Notes
|-align=center
|30
|Win
|25–3–1 
|align=left|Marcus Oliveira
|UD
|8
|Dec 18, 2021
|align=left|
|align=left|
|-align=center
|29
|Loss
|24–3–1 
|align=left|David Benavidez
|TKO
|2 (10), 
|Mar 16, 2019
|align=left|
|align=left|
|-align=center
|28
|Loss
|24–2–1 
|align=left|Peter Quillin
|UD
|10
|Aug 4, 2018
|align=left|
|align=left|
|- align=center
|27
|Win
|24–1–1 
|align=left|Jaime Barboza
|UD
|10
|May 26, 2018
|align=left|
|align=left|
|- align=center
|26
|Draw
|23–1–1 
|align=left|Abraham Han
|TD
|8 (10), 
|Sep 8, 2017
|align=left|
|align=left|
|- align=center
|25
|Win
|23–1 
|align=left|Dashon Johnson
|TKO
|6 (10), 
|Sep 16, 2016
|align=left|
|align=left|
|- align=center
|24
|Win
|22–1 
|align=left|Michael Gbenga
|RTD
|4 (10), 
|Apr 1, 2016
|align=left|
|align=left|
|- align=center
|23
|Win
|21–1 
|align=left|Marcus Upshaw
|UD
|10
|Sep 29, 2015
|align=left|
|align=left|
|-align=center
|22
|Win
|20–1 
|align=left|Jason Escalera
|TKO
|7 (10), 
|June 21, 2015
|align=left|
|align=left|
|- align=center
|21
|Win
|19–1 
|align=left|Scott Sigmon
|UD
|8
|Mar 28, 2015
|align=left|
|align=left|
|- align=center
|20
|Loss
|18–1 
|align=left|Rogelio Medina
|KO
|3 (10), 
|Aug 30, 2014
|align=left|
|align=left|
|- align=center
|19
|Win
|18–0 
|align=left|Marco Antonio Peribán
|UD
|10
|May 3, 2014
|align=left|
|align=left|
|- align=center
|18
|Win
|17–0 
|align=left|Vladine Biosse
|TKO
|10 (10), 
|Feb 28, 2014
|align=left|
|align=left|
|- align=center
|17
|Win
|16–0 
|align=left|Lajuan Simon
|KO
|6 (10), 
|Dec 6, 2013
|align=left|
|align=left|
|- align=center
|16
| style="background:#ddd;"|
|15–0 
|align=left|Gabriel Rosado
|NC
|10
|May 4, 2013
|align=left| 
|align=left|
|- align=center
|15
|Win
|15–0
|align=left|Derrick Findley
|UD
|10
|Feb 23, 2013
|align=left|
|align=left|
|- align=center
|14
|Win
|14–0
|align=left|Tyrone Selders
|TKO
|6 (8), 
|Nov 3, 2012
|align=left|
|align=left|
|- align=center
|13
|Win
|13–0
|align=left|Ramon Valenzuela, Jr.
|DQ
|8 (10), 
|Sep 8, 2012
|align=left|
|align=left|
|- align=center
|12
|Win
|12–0
|align=left|Joseph de los Santos
|UD
|8
|Jul 14, 2012
|align=left|
|align=left|
|- align=center
|11
|Win
|11–0
|align=left|Ibahiem King
|KO
|3 (8), 
|Apr 20, 2012
|align=left|
|align=left|
|- align=center
|10
|Win
|10–0
|align=left|Elie Augustama
|UD
|6
|Jan 6, 2012
|align=left|
|align=left|
|- align=center
|9
|Win
|9–0
|align=left|Eddie Hunter
|UD
|6
|Oct 1, 2011
|align=left|
|align=left|
|- align=center
|8
|Win
|8–0
|align=left|Guy Packer
|KO
|1 (4), 
|Jul 2, 2011
|align=left|
|align=left|
|- align=center
|7
|Win
|7–0
|align=left|Lamar Harris
|UD
|4
|Jun 4, 2011
|align=left|
|align=left|
|- align=center
|6
|Win
|6–0
|align=left|JC Peterson
|TKO
|2 (4), 
|Apr 16, 2011
|align=left|
|align=left|
|- align=center
|5
|Win
|align=center|5–0
|align=left|Fernando Calleros
|UD
|4
|May 22, 2010
|align=left|
|align=left|
|- align=center
|4
|Win
|4–0
|align=left|Jeremy Marts
|TKO
|1 (4), 
|May 1, 2010
|align=left|
|align=left|
|- align=center
|3
|Win
|3–0
|align=left|Bryan Smith
|KO
|2 (4), 
|Mar 25, 2010
|align=left|
|align=left|
|- align=center
|2
|Win
|2–0
|align=left|Rufus Defibaugh
|TKO
|1 (4), 
|Feb 27, 2010
|align=left|
|align=left|
|- align=center
|1
|Win
|1–0
|align=left|Vince Burkhalter
|KO
|1 (4), 1:33
|Jan 29, 2010
|align=left|
|
|- align=center

Modeling
Love also has a profession in modeling. He has had the opportunity to model with English supermodel Kate Moss in early 2007.

Notes

External links
Official website
 
 J'Leon Love - Profile, News Archive & Current Rankings at Box.Live

Boxers from Michigan
African-American boxers
African-American Muslims
American Muslims
Middleweight boxers
1987 births
Living people
Doping cases in boxing
American male boxers
People from Inkster, Michigan
21st-century African-American sportspeople
20th-century African-American people